The fifth-generation Subaru Legacy was originally unveiled as a concept car at the 2009 North American International Auto Show in Detroit to commemorate the 20th anniversary of the model, and the production version was introduced at the 2009 New York International Auto Show. Production of the fifth generation started on 29 May 2009.

Summary
 A number of design traditions have ended with the fifth generation. The side windows are no longer frameless, ending a Subaru tradition started with the first generation Leone in the early 1970s. On wagons, the "D" pillar is no longer covered in glass. The parking light switch traditionally installed on top of the steering wheel column has also been removed. An engine coolant temperature gauge is no longer offered, replaced by a fuel economy gauge instead that gives estimates in either miles per gallon or liters per 100 kilometers based on regional requirements where the vehicle is sold. When the engine temperature is below normal, an indicator light shines blue and when the engine is overheating, the light turns red. Using the key to unlock the drivers' door after locking the vehicle with the remote will set off the security system; the vehicle must be unlocked with the remote, a tradition going back to the second generation when remote keyless access was introduced.

The manual parking brake handle located between the front passenger seats has been replaced with an electric parking brake switch installed on the dashboard next to the driver's door. The term "Hill Holder" has returned but is now integrated with the electric parking brake. VDC is now standard on all models currently offered internationally. The vehicle has also added safety technologies such as Electronic Stability Control, Brake Assist, and Electronic Brakeforce Distribution to the list of standard features. The external "Limited" badge, introduced in 1998, has been retired on North American vehicles, and if the vehicle has the 3.6 L six cylinder engine, the rear of the vehicle has a "3.6R" badge applied on the bottom right side. If the vehicle has the diesel engine, a badge that says "Boxer Diesel" is installed on the middle right rear side of the vehicle. Gasoline turbocharged vehicles can be visually identified with a front hood (bonnet) installed air scoop and symmetrical dual exhaust pipes below the rear bumper.

Subaru introduced improvements to the chassis, that they call Dynamic Chassis Control Concept, which uses high-tensile steel in critical areas to achieve high strength with lighter weight. The front-end structure introduces Cradle Mount that isolates the suspension and engine from the passenger compartment for a smoother and quieter ride using rubber mounts. New for this generation is a double wishbone rear suspension, with all suspension links and the rear differential isolated from the rear subframe with large rubber mounts to minimize noise and vibration intruding into the passenger compartment.

North American models

The interior is available in 2 colors (Warm Ivory or Off-Black) with leather offered on Limited trim packages. Standard on Limited models, and optional on Premium models, is a 440 W, 9-speaker Harman/Kardon audio system using Dolby Pro Logic II technology and DTS Digital Sound is standard, with Bluetooth and iPod capability, and an optional 8- voice activated GPS touch screen navigation system. A Harman/Kardon sourced stereo with a single disc in-dash CD player and SRS Circle Surround sound is the standard sound system offered with four speakers on all other models. A separate Bluetooth wireless package with voice recognition, called Blueconnect, is available optionally on all trim packages without the GPS/stereo package, installed in the center of the dashboard below the standard sound system, and is not offered internationally. Black housing for headlights is not offered on North American models. The front hood (bonnet) and front bumper covers are unique to the North American market due to slight changes in the sheet metal in comparison to those items used internationally. This is due to the North American Outback grille sharing a more prominent appearance also used on the third generation Forester and facelifted Tribeca and the hood and front bumper are shared on North American Legacies and Outbacks.

A dual zone climate control system is standard and available only on Limited trim designations with a 6-speed fan; the standard air conditioning/heating system has a 4-speed fan. Lower trim levels have silver metallic trim on the interior door panels and dashboard, with woodgrain on Limited vehicles. An optional LED accessory lighting package in blue can be installed for the front passenger footwells and a matching illuminated sill panel for the front doors. Oddly, the North American version has exposed cupholders without a retractable cover, whereas international versions have a retractable cover for the console installed cupholders. For model year 2011, the 2.5GT received some interior changes, replacing the woodgrain inserts on the doors and dashboard with faux carbon fiber inserts already offered on Legacy models internationally, along with contrasting stitching on the black leather interior, similar to the Japanese version and aluminum cross drilled pedals. XM Satellite Radio is also offered on Premium and Limited trim packages.

All models include painted exterior door handles, with black exterior side mirrors on the base level 2.5i sedan. Turn signal repeaters are no longer integrated into the side exterior mirrors, unlike the previous generation, however, for model year 2011 the exterior mirrors can be manually folded in. The 2.5i model is still certified as PZEV and is available for sale in all 50 states, with a badge installed on the right rear side of the vehicle. Other models have been certified LEV2 or ULEV. Premium unleaded fuel is required for vehicles identified as GT, where the engines are equipped with a turbocharger. The 2.5 L flat-4 engine without a turbo is available with a six speed manual transmission, a characteristic shared with Australia only.

Marketing 

In 2010, Subaru introduced an advertising campaign to market their 2011 Legacy (Mediocrity (advertising campaign). The campaign, which was a parody, included a series of television advertisements and a microsite. The 2011 "Mediocrity" was a basic, beige four-door mid-size sedan that featured an exterior design to a 2001-2006 Hyundai Sonata or Kia Optima with modified styling. On the website for the 2011 Mediocrity, a link to the 2011 Subaru Legacy was provided, noting that website visitors should click the link if they are looking for a more exciting vehicle.

Japanese models

SI-Drive, or Subaru Intelligent-Drive , is standard equipment on all trim versions. It is a feature that enables three distinctly different modes of vehicle performance characteristics (identified as "Sport", "Sport Sharp", and "Intelligent") by regulating the engine control unit (ECU), the automatic transmission control unit (TCU, if equipped), and by fine-tuning the electronically controlled throttle. The SI-Drive control knob is installed on the center console between the heated front seat control switches. The "Intelligent" mode makes throttle response more gradual, and decreases maximum engine power by 10 percent. The "Sport" mode allows the engine to run at higher speeds and increases fuel efficiency by 5 percent in comparison to Subaru engines without the feature. The "Sport # (Sharp)" mode makes throttle response more abrupt and enables the automatic transmission to maintain higher RPM's within a given gear's range, and minimizes steering wheel effort. When the engine is started, the default setting is the "Sport" selection. SI-Cruise is an autonomous cruise control system that can reduce or resume a preset speed, or bring the vehicle to a complete stop if the system detects a slower vehicle is being followed, without driver intervention.

Japanese buyers can choose two different premium level entertainment systems; they can select the previously described Harman/Kardon GPS-stereo with six speakers, or a McIntosh sourced GPS/stereo with Dolby Digital 5.1 Surround Sound, a separate powered amplifier and 10 speakers. Both units are Gracenote, G-BOOK and VICS enabled, with both systems available with an internal 600 MHz 40GB HDD coupled with a digital TV tuner that can be watched when the transmission is in park and the parking brake applied. Both stereos are compatible with CD, CD-R/RW, DVD and DVD R/RW as well as MP3 and WMA music formats. A Harman/Kardon sourced stereo with a 6-disc in-dash CD changer and SRS Circle Surround sound is the entry level sound system offered with six speakers and is standard equipment. The center dashboard trim is color matched based on the stereo installed; if it has the Harman/Kardon units, the trim color is silver brushed aluminum, and if the McIntosh is installed the trim color is black brushed aluminum. The climate controls are also colored either silver or black as well.

Both GPS navigation systems can be displayed in a split screen format that shows both two- and three dimensions with graphic landmarks. Trim panels on the doors and the dashboard can be exchanged for an optional second woodgrain appearance or carbon fiber. The front and rear bumper covers can also be exchanged for Subaru designed aero-effects, allowing the buyer to install two types of mesh grilles, a choice of two front fog light selections, and a choice of oval or trapezoidal dual rear exhaust ports in chrome. A rear wiper is still available optionally on the back of the sedan, a tradition established with the first generation Legacy. The Warm Ivory interior color is only available on vehicles with the "L" package and SI-Cruise models; all other trim levels are available with black interior with black cloth upholstery, with leather offered optionally on the "L" package and SI-Cruise model. The dual-zone climate control system is standard on all trim levels.

A smart key is available as an option coupled with two position memory seat that memorizes driver's seat positions and adjustments, exterior mirror adjustments, and climate control settings. The settings can be customized based on the smart key module being used to unlock and start the car. Turn signal repeaters are still integrated into the side exterior mirrors on all Japanese-spec models. The black leather interior installed on vehicles with the "S" package can be fitted with optional black corduroy inserts with white contrasting French stitching on all visible seams and aluminum cross drilled brake, clutch and accelerator pedals. The Legacy wagon can be fitted with twin white LED lights installed on the interior hatch vertically surrounding the rear window with a separate light switch for additional illumination when the rear hatch is open. An optional LED accessory lighting package in either white or blue can be installed for the front and rear passenger footwells and a matching illuminated sill panel for the front and rear doors, and the standard overhead dome light can be exchanged for white LED as well.

HID headlights are standard equipment on all trim levels except the base 2.5i coupled with headlight washers. Rain sensing automatic wipers are also available. A choice between two backup cameras can be installed, along with front parking assist sensors. Bilstein struts continue to be available for performance handling. Air vents are installed for rear passengers at the back of the center front armrest compartment. According to the JDM STi Accessories brochure for the fifth generation Legacy sold in Japan, buyers can choose from several options to include stiffer springs for the suspension, short throw gear shift and specially designed 18 inch alloy wheels from BBS and ENKEI.

On the one-year anniversary of the introduction of the fifth generation, "EyeSight" was once again offered on the Touring Wagon only. EyeSight consists of 2 cameras with one on each side of the interior rear view mirror, that use human like stereoscopic vision to judge distances and generally keep tabs on the driver. The system can help maintain a safe distance on the highway, a lane departure warning system, a wake up call when traffic lights change, and even keeps an eye out for pedestrians. SI-Cruise has been integrated into the EyeSight feature as a driver safety aid.

Legacy 2.5GT tS
In June 2010, the Legacy 2.5GT tS or tuned by STI (Subaru Tecnica International) was released for the Japanese Domestic Market. Built only as 600 units limited edition, the 2.5GT tS is available as B4 Sedan and Touring Wagon.

The modifications were focused on sharper handling and ride improvements. STI flexible tower bar, Bilstein inverted struts with stiffer springs, front flexible low stiffeners, and rear pillow-ball, and reinforced front crossmember means the 2.5GT tS has more rigidity and better steering feedback.

With front lip spoiler, 18 inch alloys, sport exhaust system, "tS" grille emblem, lip trunk spoiler (B4 Sedan), or roof spoiler (Touring Wagon), the Legacy 2.5GT tS has a sportier appearance than the regular 2.5GT.

Inside, the 2.5GT tS has black leather and Alcantara sports seats with red seams and STI label, titanium-finished instrument panels, and STI logo on the speedometer, steering wheel, shift lever, engine start/stop button, and floor mats.

Legacy 2.0GT DIT
Starting May 8, 2012, Subaru has replaced the EJ engine series with the new FA and FB engine series, co-developed with Toyota, and uses the FB25 on all trim packages, with the FA20 installed with a turbocharger called the Legacy GT DIT (direct injection turbo).

United Kingdom models

Currently only the wagon, called Legacy Tourer, is available to United Kingdom buyers with a choice of the Subaru EE turbodiesel with a six-speed manual transmission only or the 2.5 L with the continuously variable transmission only. The 3.6 L flat-6 engine and the turbocharged gasoline engine are not offered. The interior is available in black only, with cloth interior available on the 2.0D S base model and leather on all other trim levels. The interior trim strips on the doors and dashboard are silver on the base model and carbon fiber on all other models. The front bumper and bonnet use the Japanese configuration, to include self-levelling HID headlights and headlight washers. The SE model has sporty front bumper. The UK and Europe are offered an exterior paint selection, called Camellia Red Pearl that is not available in Japan or North America. Bilstein struts are standard on all trim levels except the 2.0D S. The dual-zone climate-control system is standard on all trim levels. All engines offered in the Legacy are Euro5 compliant. For vehicle security, a Thatcham Category 1 perimeter alarm and immobilizer, along with a rolling code ECU engine immobiliser are standard equipment.

The smart key is available on NavPlus models only using the Harman/Kardon GPS-stereo unit, and the two-position memory seat is available on all models except the 2.0D S trim level. 16-inch alloy wheels are standard on the 2.0D S model and 18-inch alloy wheels are standard on all other models. Rain sensing automatic wipers are standard on all models, as well as heated exterior mirrors, glass moonroof, heated front seats, fog lights, and tilt and telescoping steering wheel. The Harman/Kardon GPS/stereo with six speakers and the rear-view backup camera is installed only on vehicles with the voice recognition NavPlus system. The standard stereo system uses the Harman/Kardon sourced in-dash six-disc CD auto-changer.

European models

The European Legacy is available as either a sedan or wagon, and the engine choices are the flat-4 EE20 2.0 L turbodiesel, the EJ20 2.0 L, or the EJ25 2.5 L. Legacy GT with EJ25 turbocharged engine and 5-speed automatic transmission has been available in selected European countries. It has been phased out since (no official explanation has been presented). Even though its more rugged brother Outback is available with 3.6 L flat-6 engine, currently the most powerful engine choice for the Legacy sold on European market is naturally aspirated 170HP (130 kW) 2.5L coupled with Lineatronic gearbox. The interior colors of Warm Ivory or Off Black are offered, but the Warm Ivory is only available in leather. Carbon Fiber accents are only available on the Sport trim package with black leather interior. The dual-zone climate control system is standard on all trim levels. The turbodiesel is available with the Warm Ivory interior with the Harman/Kardon GPS sound system with six speakers and the satellite navigation, but the only transmission offered is the six speed manual transmission. All engines except turbocharged EJ25 are Euro5 compliant.

Cruise control, heated seats, automatic windshield wipers, HID headlights with headlight washers, heated exterior mirrors, glass moonroof and 17" wheels are standard equipment. 18" alloy wheels are standard on the lop level trim packages Comfort and Sport. The smart key is available only on the Sport or Comfort trim packages, coupled with the Harman/Kardon satellite navigation system and memory seats. The front hood (bonnet) and front bumper covers use the Japanese configuration, with turn signal repeaters on the exterior mirrors, and standard equipment front and rear foglights. Japan and Europe are offered an exterior paint selection, called Dark Amethyst Silica that is not available in the UK or North America.

South African models

The Legacy is offered as a sedan with black interior; specifications are similar to European "Comfort" trim package. The Legacy 2.0i Premium comes with the choice of a six-speed manual transmission or Lineartronic CVT, leather trim, power driver's front seat with memory function, dual zone climate control, electric sunroof and 16 inch alloy wheels. The Legacy 2.5i Sport Premium CVT adds dual front electric seats, carbon-fibre dash inserts, alloy pedals, sports front bumper and grille; Bilstein suspension, 18-inch alloy wheels and Xenon headlights with headlight washers to the Premium package. Satellite navigation is not offered along with the premium Harman/Kardon sound system.

Australian model

The Liberty sedan and wagon sold in Australia resembles the vehicle sold in Europe, with some features only available in Japan. The engines offered are the EJ25, EZ36 and the EJ25 with a turbo. Australians can choose either the Lineartronic CVT or a 6-speed manual transmission on the 2.5i, a 6-speed manual or 5-speed automatic transmission on the 2.5GT, but transmission choices on the EZ36 are limited to the 5-speed automatic. The Off Black interior color is standard across the range, however the Warm Ivory is available on the 3.6R, with leather interior offered on vehicles identified as "Premium". Cloth is offered on the 2.5i in black only. SI-Drive is offered on the 3.6R or the 2.5GT. The front bumper and hood (bonnet) use the Japanese configuration. Bilstein struts are standard equipment on all vehicles identified as 2.5i Sports and the 2.5GT turbo. The 2.5i Sports models and the 2.5GT can be identified by black housing for the HID headlights.

The dual-zone climate control system is standard on all trim levels. Sound systems offered include the McIntosh GPS/stereo unit with 10 speakers, a separate powered amplifier and satellite navigation provided by "WhereIs", a service provided by Telstra Corporation Ltd, or the Harman/Kardon stereo with the satellite navigation and 6 speakers or the unit offered in North America and Europe with a 6-disc in-dash CD changer and 6 speakers. The McIntosh unit sold in Australia has function buttons written in English and is different from the Japanese unit, due to Japanese characters being used on some of the functions. The Australian McIntosh or Harman/Kardon GPS-stereo packages are not Gracenote, G-BOOK and VICS enabled, and do not have the internal 600 MHz 40GB HDD coupled with a digital TV tuner. The center dashboard trim is color matched based on the stereo installed; if it has either one of the Harman/Kardon units, the trim color is silver brushed aluminum, and if the McIntosh is installed the trim color is black brushed aluminum. The climate controls are also colored either silver or black as well. Silver trim is installed on the doors and dashboard on the 2.5i and 2.5i Premium, carbon fiber inserts on the 2.5i Sports models and the 2.5GT, with woodgrain available only on the 3.6R sedan. Cruise control, heated seats, automatic windshield wipers, HID headlights with headlight washers, heated exterior mirrors, with 17" wheels as standard equipment on the 2.5i, 2.5i Premium, 2.5i Premium SatNav and 18" wheels on the 2.5i Sports, Sports Premium, Sports Premium SatNav and the 2.5GT Premium SatNav. The smart key is available only on the 2.5GT or the 3.6R, and the glass moonroof is only offered on Premium trim packages.

Outback

Based on the fifth generation Legacy, the fourth generation Subaru Outback was introduced in April 2009 at the New York Auto Show, the fifteenth anniversary of the first Outback's introduction at the same event. The Outback was introduced in Japan May 20, 2009. The "Legacy" prefix has been dropped internationally. Air Bags are offered for the driver and front passenger, side bolster airbags for front seats on the outer edge, side curtain airbags for front and rear passengers and a knee bolster air bag for the driver.

The double-sized moonroof is no longer being offered, and has been reduced to a conventional size that doesn't extend over the rear seats. The turbocharged engine is also no longer offered on all international versions of the Outback. An engine coolant temperature gauge is no longer offered, replaced by a fuel economy gauge instead. When the engine temperature is below normal, an indicator light shines blue and when the engine is overheating, the light turns red. Using the key to unlock the drivers' door after locking the vehicle with the remote will set off the security system; the vehicle must be unlocked with the remote, a tradition going back to the first generation when remote keyless access was introduced.

The side windows are no longer frameless, ending a Subaru tradition started with the first generation Leone in the early 1970s. The "D" pillar on the wagon is no longer covered in glass, also ending a design tradition established with the first generation and borrowed from the Subaru XT. The front and rear bumper covers are no longer painted a contrasting color, but the plastic side body cladding continues. The external "Limited" badge has been retired on North American vehicles, and if the vehicle has the 3.6 L six-cylinder engine, the rear of the vehicle has a "3.6R" badge applied internationally. Black housing for headlights is not offered on the Outback worldwide. The Outback with 2.0 L diesel engine can be distinguished by its hood scoop and "Boxer Diesel" emblem on the rear. January 21, 2010, the Outback was introduced for sale in South Korea.

Subaru introduced improvements to the chassis that they call Dynamic Chassis Control Concept, which uses high-tensile steel in critical areas to achieve high strength with lighter weight. The front-end structure introduces Cradle Mount that isolates the suspension and engine from the passenger compartment for a smoother and quieter ride using rubber mounts. New for this generation is a double wishbone rear suspension, with all suspension links and the rear differential isolated from the rear subframe with large rubber mounts to minimize noise and vibration intruding into the passenger compartment. Subaru has also added safety technologies such as Electronic Stability Control, Brake Assist, and Electronic Brakeforce Distribution to the list of standard features.

In North America, the fourth generation Outback won Motor Trend's Sport/Utility of the Year Award for 2010, and Ward's Automotive Group's 2010 Interior of the Year awards in the popular-priced car category under $29,999.

North American models
Trim level designations have been modified based on the engine installed; the Subaru EJ engine 2.5 L naturally aspirated engine are labeled 2.5i, 2.5i Premium, and 2.5i Limited, with the Subaru EZ 6-cylinder engine identified as 3.6R, 3.6R Premium and 3.6R Limited. As with previous generations, leather interior is only available in 2 colors (Warm Ivory or Off-Black) on Limited trim packages on specific exterior colors, and a glass moonroof is optional only on the Limited; cloth interiors are offered in the specified colors on lower trim level packages. A 440 W, 9-speaker Harman/Kardon audio system, using Dolby Pro Logic II technology and DTS Digital Sound, with Bluetooth and iPod capability is optional on the Limited trim packages. An  voice activated GPS touch screen navigation system is optional only on the Limited. A separate Bluetooth wireless package with voice recognition, called Blueconnect, is available on lower trim levels and is not offered internationally. A Harman/Kardon-sourced stereo with a 6-disc in-dash CD changer and SRS Circle Surround sound is the standard sound system provided, with four speakers on all trim levels. A dual zone digital climate control system with 6-speed fan is standard and only available on the Limited; the base and Premium model have a 4-speed fan. Base and Premium trim levels have silver metallic trim on the interior door panels and dashboard; the Limited trim package has woodgrain accents.

All trim levels are fitted with a retractable roof installed luggage rack, where the crossmembers are permanently attached but can be swung into the luggage carrier support structure when not in use, currently available only on North American models. Also, the North American Outback has lower side body claddings, which are not applied to international models (although the cladding may come on international models as a dealer-installed option). The interior retractable rear cargo cover has a separate storage compartment in the spare tire storage area so that the cargo cover can be removed for large items but stored inside the vehicle and out of the way. The rear seatbacks can be partially reclined for comfort.
 The 2010 model year had eight exterior colors: Azurite Blue Pearl, Crystal Black Silica, Cypress Green Pearl, Graphite Gray Metallic, Harvest Gold Metallic, Satin White Pearl, Sky Blue Metallic, Steel Silver Metallic.
 The 2011 model year had nine exterior colors: Azurite Blue Pearl, Caramel Bronze Pearl, Crystal Black Silica, Cypress Green Pearl, Graphite Gray Metallic, Ruby Red Pearl, Satin White Pearl, Sky Blue Metallic, Steel Silver Metallic. The exterior color Harvest Gold Metallic was removed for the 2011 model year. The exterior colors Caramel Bronze Pearl and Ruby Red Pearl were added for the 2011 model year.
 The 2012 model year had nine exterior colors: Caramel Bronze Pearl, Crystal Black Silica, Cypress Green Pearl, Deep Indigo Pearl, Graphite Gray Metallic, Ice Silver Metallic, Ruby Red Pearl, Satin White Pearl, Sky Blue Metallic. The exterior colors Azurite Blue Pearl and Steel Silver Metallic were removed for the 2012 model year. The exterior colors Deep Indigo Pearl and Ice Silver Metallic were added for the 2012 model year.
 The 2013 model year had ten exterior colors: Brilliant Brown Pearl (available for a limited time, in a Special Appearance Package only), Caramel Bronze Pearl, Crystal Black Silica, Cypress Green Pearl, Deep Indigo Pearl, Graphite Gray Metallic, Ice Silver Metallic, Satin White Pearl, Twilight Blue Metallic, and Venetian Red Pearl. The exterior colors Ruby Red Pearl and Sky Blue Metallic were removed for the 2013 model year. The exterior colors Twilight Blue Metallic and Venetian Red Pearl were added for the 2013 model year.

All models are now available with painted exterior door handles, with black exterior side mirrors on the base level 2.5i, and painted mirrors on Premium and Limited. The Limited can be identified externally by simulated aluminium surround for the front foglights and matching trim piece on the bottom edges of the side door sill protector, front, and rear bumpers; the Premium and base model remain black. The grille appearance is unique on North American models so as to provide a visual similarity to the larger facelifted Tribeca and the third generation Forester. The 2.5i uses the flat-4 engine with 6-speed manual transmission or the optional Lineartronic Continuously variable transmission with steering column-mounted paddle shifters that allows the driver to select 6 "virtual gears" in manual mode. The 3.6R uses the flat-6 engine (from the Subaru Tribeca) exclusively with a 5-speed automatic transmission. The conventional automatic transmission is only available with the flat-6 engine, and the 6-speed manual transmission is not available on the 2.5i Limited. The PZEV Outback 2.5i, identified by a badge attached to the rear of the vehicle, continues to be sold in all 50 states, unlike other manufacturers who only sell PZEV certified vehicles in states that have adopted California emission standards. All other models have been certified LEV2 or ULEV.

In the States, in 2010 and 2011 Erika Davies is the voice of the Subaru Outback commercial featuring the song "I Love You, I Do".

For the 2013 model year, Subaru refreshed the Outback, and it debuted at the 2012 New York Auto Show.

Japanese models
The Japanese-specification Outback is available with either the 2.5 L flat-4 or the 3.6 L flat-6 engine. The EJ20 engine is no longer used in the Legacy or the Legacy Outback. The trim levels are 2.5i, 2.5i L package and 3.6R and 3.6R SI-Cruise. SI-Cruise is an autonomous cruise control system that can reduce or resume a preset speed or bring the vehicle to a complete stop if the system detects a slower vehicle is being followed, without driver intervention. Air vents are installed for rear passengers at the back of the center front armrest compartment. The front hood (bonnet) and front bumper covers are not interchangeable with the North American version due to slight changes in the sheet metal.
Turn signal repeaters are still integrated into the side exterior mirrors on all Japanese-spec models. Woodgrain accents are standard on the "L" package and the SI-Cruise vehicle, silver accents on lower trim levels.

SI-Drive, or Subaru Intelligent-Drive, is standard equipment on all trim versions. It is a feature that enables three distinctly different modes of vehicle performance characteristics (identified as "Sport", "Sport Sharp", and "Intelligent") by regulating the engine control unit (ECU), the automatic transmission control unit (TCU, if equipped), and by fine-tuning the electronically controlled throttle. The SI-Drive control knob is installed on the center console between the heated front seat control switches. The "Intelligent" mode makes throttle response more gradual, and decreases maximum engine power by 10 percent. The "Sport" mode allows the engine to run at higher speeds and increases fuel efficiency by 5 percent in comparison to Subaru engines without the feature. The "Sport # (Sharp)" mode makes throttle response more abrupt and enables the automatic transmission to maintain higher RPMs within a given gear's range, and minimizes the electric power steering wheel effort. When the engine is started, the default setting is the "Sport" selection.

Japanese buyers can choose two different premium level entertainment systems; they can select the previously described Harman/Kardon GPS-stereo with six speakers, or a McIntosh sourced GPS/stereo with Dolby Digital 5.1 Surround Sound, a separate powered amplifier and 10 speakers. Both units are Gracenote, G-BOOK and VICS enabled, with both systems available with an internal 600 MHz 40GB HDD coupled with a digital TV tuner that can be watched when the transmission is in park and the parking brake applied. Both stereos are compatible with CD, CD-R/RW, DVD and DVD R/RW as well as MP3 and WMA music formats. A Harman/Kardon sourced stereo with a 6-disc in-dash CD changer and SRS Circle Surround sound is the entry level sound system offered with six speakers and is standard equipment. The McIntosh stereo facia is offered in the trademark black with a clear plastic overlay and the center dashboard trim piece retains the brushed aluminum appearance but the color is black, with the climate controls offered in a matching black appearance, instead of the standard silver. Oddly, the Japanese version has a retractable cover for the console installed cupholders, whereas the North American version has exposed cupholders without a retractable cover. The dual-zone climate control system is standard on all trim levels.

The GPS navigation system can be displayed in a split-screen format showing both two- and three dimensions with graphic landmarks instead of a flat screen without geographical images. HID headlights are standard on all models except the base 2.5i, as well as automatic rain sensing windshield wipers and headlight washers. A smart key is available as an option coupled with two position memory seat that memorizes driver's seat positions and adjustments, exterior mirror adjustment, and climate control settings. The settings can be customized based on the smart key module being used to unlock and start the car. The Outback can be fitted with twin white LED lights installed on the interior hatch vertically surrounding the rear window, with a separate light switch for additional illumination when the rear hatch is open.

On the first anniversary of the introduction of the fourth generation, "EyeSight" was once again offered on the Japanese-spec Outback. EyeSight consists of 2 cameras with one on each side of the interior rear-view mirror, that use human-like stereoscopic vision to judge distances and generally keep tabs on the driver. The system can help maintain a safe distance on the highway, a lane departure warning system, a wake up call when traffic lights change, and even keeps an eye out for pedestrians. SI-Cruise has been integrated into the EyeSight feature as a driver safety aid.

European models
The European engine choices are the flat-4 EE20 2.0 L turbodiesel, the EJ25 2.5 L or the EZ36 3.6 L flat-6, with SI-Drive available only on the six-cylinder. Trim level packages are the 2.0D Comfort, Trend and Active, the 2.5i Comfort and Trend, or the 3.6R Exclusive. The interior colors of Warm Ivory or Off Black are offered, but the Warm Ivory interior is only available in leather. Wood accents are only available on the Exclusive trim package. The dual-zone climate control system is standard on all trim levels. The turbodiesel is available with the Warm Ivory interior with the Harman/Kardon sound system with six speakers and the satellite navigation, but the only transmission offered is the six-speed manual transmission. Cruise control, heated seats, automatic windshield wipers, HID headlights with headlight washers, heated exterior mirrors, glass moonroof and 17" wheels are standard equipment. The smart key is available only on the Exclusive or Comfort trim packages, coupled with the satellite navigation system and memory seats. The front hood (bonnet) and front bumper covers use the Japanese configuration, with turnsignal repeaters on the exterior mirrors, and standard equipment front and rear foglights. The turbodiesel and the 2.5i engines are Euro5 compliant.

2013 brings a facelift of the model with minor updates on the exterior and interior. Steering and handling is improved, and CVT is offered with the diesel engine.
A new multimedia navigation unit is offered.

United Kingdom models

The Outback is available to United Kingdom buyers with a choice of the flat-4 Subaru EE turbodiesel with a 6-speed manual transmission, the 2.5 L flat-4 with the CVT transmission, or the 3.6 L flat-6 engine with SI-Drive and a 5-speed automatic transmission. The trim level packages are the 2.0D SE and 2.0D SE NavPlus diesel, the 2.5i SE and the 2.5i SE NavPlus and the 3.6R. The interior is offered in black only, with leather on all trim levels. The interior trim strips on the doors and dashboard are silver on all models except the 3.6R, which has woodgrain trim. The front bumper and bonnet use the Japanese configuration, to include self-levelling HID headlights and headlight washers. The UK and Europe are offered an exterior paint selection, called Camellia Red Pearl that is not available in Japan or North America. For vehicle security, a Thatcham Category 1 perimeter alarm and immobiliser, along with a rolling code ECU engine immobiliser are standard equipment. The dual-zone climate control system is standard on all trim levels. The 2.5i and the turbodiesel engines are Euro5 compliant.

The smart key is available on NavPlus and 3.6R models only. 17" alloy wheels are standard on all models, as well as rain sensing automatic wipers, two position memory seat, heated exterior mirrors, glass moonroof, heated front seats, fog lights, and tilt and telescoping steering wheel. The Harman/Kardon stereo with 6 speakers and the rear-view backup camera is installed only on vehicles with the voice recognition NavPlus system. The standard stereo system uses an in-dash 6-disc CD auto-changer and automatic speed-sensing volume adjustment that is MP3 player compatible.

South African models
The Outback is offered with black interior; specifications are similar to European "Comfort" trim package. Outback 2.5i Premium is available with the choice of Lineartronic CVT or six-speed manual transmission, including leather trim, memory function for the driver's seat, electric sunroof, dual zone climate control and rear air vents. Satellite navigation is not offered along with the premium Harman/Kardon sound system.

Recently, the 2.0 diesel (6-speed manual only) and 3.6R models have been introduced.

Australian models

The Outback sold in Australia resembles the vehicle sold in Europe, with some features only available in Japan. The trim level packages are the 2.5i, 2.5i Premium, 2.5i Premium SatNav, the 3.6R, 3.6R Premium SatNav and the diesel 2.0D, 2.0D Premium, 2.0D Premium SatNav. The engines offered are the EJ25, EZ36 and the EE20 turbodiesel. Australians can choose either the Lineartronic CVT or a 6-speed manual transmission on the EJ25, but transmission choices on the EZ36 are limited to the 5-speed automatic, and the EE20 turbodiesel is available with the 6-speed manual transmission exclusively. The Off Black interior color is standard across the range, however the Warm Ivory is available on the 3.6R, with leather interior offered on vehicles identified as "Premium". Cloth is offered on the 2.5i, 3.6R and the 2.0D. SI-Drive is only available on the 3.6R, following the international trend. The front bumper and hood (bonnet) use the Japanese configuration. The Australian EJ25 and EE20 engines are Euro4 compliant.

The dual-zone climate control system is standard on all trim levels. Sound systems offered include the McIntosh stereo with 10 speakers, a separate powered amplifier and satellite navigation provided by "WhereIs", a service provided by Telstra Corporation Ltd, or the Harman/Kardon stereo with the satellite navigation and 6 speakers, or the unit offered in North America and Europe with a 6-disc in-dash CD changer and 6 speakers. The McIntosh unit sold in Australia has function buttons written in English and is different from the Japanese unit, due to Japanese characters being used on some of the functions. The Australian McIntosh or Harman/Kardon GPS-stereo packages are not Gracenote, G-BOOK and VICS enabled, and do not have the internal 600 MHz 40GB HDD coupled with a digital TV tuner. The center dashboard trim is color matched based on the stereo installed; if it has either one of the Harman/Kardon units, the trim color is silver brushed aluminum, and if the McIntosh is installed the trim color is black brushed aluminum. The climate controls are also colored either silver or black as well. Silver trim is installed on the doors and dashboard, with woodgrain available only on the 3.6R. Cruise control, heated seats, automatic windshield wipers, HID headlights with headlight washers, heated exterior mirrors, and 17" wheels are standard equipment. The smart key is available only on the 3.6R, and the glass moonroof is only offered on Premium trim packages.

Specifications

Chassis types

Engines

Transmissions

Models with Lineartronic Continuously variable transmission include steering column mounted paddle shifters that allows the driver to select 6 "virtual gears" in manual mode.

References

All USA specifications mentioned in the above article were transcribed from a 2010 Subaru Legacy North American sales brochure printed June 2009. Japanese specifications were transcribed from a JDM Subaru Legacy brochure printed May 2009 that included an STi accessories sheet, Accessories catalog and a separate Navigation and Audio brochure. UK specifications are taken from a UK specific sales brochure. European specifications are taken from a European specific brochure printed September 2009.

External links
 North American 2010 Legacy Specifications
 Japan Subaru Legacy pages: Touring Wagon , B4, Outback
 Subaru global pages: MY2010

Legacy (5th generation)
Cars introduced in 2009
2010s cars
Vehicles with CVT transmission
Cars powered by boxer engines